Simone Auriletto (born 30 December 1998) is an Italian footballer who plays as a centre back for  club Avellino.

Club career
He made his Serie C debut for Reggina on 30 December 2017 in a game against Catanzaro.

On 31 August 2018, he signed with the Serie C club Matera.

On 21 February 2019, he joined Serie C Club Pro Vercelli.

On 11 July 2022, Auriletto moved to Avellino on a two-year contract.

References

External links
 

1998 births
Living people
Footballers from Turin
Italian footballers
Association football defenders
Serie C players
Torino F.C. players
Reggina 1914 players
Matera Calcio players
F.C. Pro Vercelli 1892 players
U.S. Avellino 1912 players
Italy youth international footballers